Harald Deilmann (30 August 1920 – 1 January 2008) was a German architect.

Born in Gladbeck, Westphalia, Deilmann was best known for his work on public spaces, such as opera houses and museums, throughout Germany and worldwide. He was a member of the Akademie der Künste (Academy of the Arts) in Berlin, as well as the Deutsche Akademie für Städtebau und Landesplanung (German Academy for Urban and Regional Planning) in Hanover, Germany.

He was an associate of Heinrich Bartmann (1951–1953) and joined the Architektenteam Münster (Harald Deilmann, Max von Hausen,  in the competition for the theater Münster in 1953. He left the team before the opening of the theater Münster to start his own office in 1956. He took part in the development of his home town Münster in the time of the German Wirtschaftswunder 1950–1975. As a protagonist of postwar modernism he taught architecture at the Technical University Stuttgart and Dortmund.

Deilmann officially retired in 1985 but continued to do freelance work until his death in Münster.

Selected awards
1962 grand prize for North Westphalia architecture
1998 Cross of the White Rose, Helsinki, Finland.

Selected projects
 Theater:
 1952–1955: Stadttheater Münster
 1959–1988: Aalto Theatre, Essen (nach Alvar Aalto)
 Theater in Tokyo
 City Halls:
 1957: Rathaus Nordwalde
 1971–1974: Rathaus Rheda-Wiedenbrück
 Rathaus Gronau, North Rhine-Westphalia
 Schools and Universities
 Schülerinternat Münster
 Bielefeld University (competition)
 Martin-Luther-Schule Bielefeld
 Realschule Lemgo
 Metallberufsschule
 John F. Kennedy School, Berlin
 Museums
 Clemens-Sels-Museum Neuss
 Banks:
 WestLB Dortmund
 Town or urban planning:
 Stadtkern Werne
 Allwetterzoo Münster
 Office Buildings:
 Kreishaus Münster
 Verwaltung Nordwest Lotto Münster
 Hauptverwaltung LVA Rheinprovinz Düsseldorf
 Hauptverwaltung WestLB Münster, Düsseldorf und Dortmund
 Verwaltungsgebäude Wohnbauförderungsanstalt Düsseldorf
 Verwaltung Volkswohl-Bund in Dortmund
 Hospitals:
 Aggertalklinik Engelskirchen
 Städt. Krankenhaus Siegburg
 Fachklinikum Bad Salzuflen, Ahlbeck Reingau
 St.-Barbara-Krankenhaus Gladbeck
 Miscellaneous:
 1979–1981: Rheinturm Düsseldorf

External links

Architekt Deilmann obituary 

1920 births
2008 deaths
People from Gladbeck
20th-century German architects
People from the Province of Westphalia
University of Stuttgart alumni
Academic staff of the University of Stuttgart
Academic staff of the Technical University of Dortmund
Academic staff of the University of Hanover
Commanders Crosses of the Order of Merit of the Federal Republic of Germany